Janice Wendell Crouch (née Bethany; May 14, 1938 – May 31, 2016) was an American religious broadcaster. Crouch and her husband, Paul, founded the Trinity Broadcasting Network (TBN) in 1973.

Early life and ministry
Crouch was the daughter of Reverend and Mrs. Edgar W. Bethany, and grew up in Columbus, Georgia. Her father served as an Assemblies of God pastor, and was the founding president of Southeastern University (Florida). While attending Evangel College in Springfield, Missouri, Crouch met Paul F. Crouch. They married in 1957, and have two sons, Paul Jr. and Matthew, both of whom are high-ranking officials and program hosts on TBN. Jan Crouch also loved children and was well known in the early days of TBN for a child's puppet (a little pink girl in a dress) she called Babushka.

TBN

Founding
In 1973, Paul and Jan Crouch co-founded Trinity Broadcasting Network (TBN) along with Jim and Tammy Faye Bakker (the Bakkers left in 1975). In 1974, TBN purchased its first TV station, KLXA-TV (channel 40, now KTBN-TV) in Southern California, and began distribution through cable systems in 1978. Under the Crouch family, TBN grew to become the United States' largest Christian television network, offering 24-hour commercial-free programming, and TBN is currently third-largest over-the-air station group in the United States (measured as percentage of homes reached), with CBS, Fox, and NBC holding the 4th, 5th and 6th place, according to TV News Check's annual listing of the Top 30 station groups.

Growth of TBN
Since its founding, Crouch served as TBN's vice president and director of network programming, as well as the director of programming for TBN's affiliated networks, such as the Smile of a Child children's channel, the JUCE TV youth network, The Church Channel, the TBN Enlace USA Spanish language network, and others. She was also the President and manager of The Holy Land Experience theme park in Orlando, Florida.  Jan Crouch and her husband Paul Crouch, senior also signed off on Matt Crouch (TBN) and his wife Laurie—now in charge at TBN, i.e. PTL (Praise the Lord) their signature & original show, as now becoming rather the primary hosts, as well as Behind the Scenes— to have produced over 4 plus major motion pictures, along with other associated and film entertainment groups to make namely Faith-based movies like 'End Times' films The Omega Code (1999) and its sequel Megiddo: The Omega Code 2 (2001).

Lawsuits

In March 2012, Crouch was accused by her granddaughter, a former employee and chief finance director of the network (a registered charity), of misappropriating network funds to spend on a lavish lifestyle. Expenditures included expensive homes, private jets, massive custom wigs, and a $100,000 air conditioned mobile home solely for her dogs. The New York Times wrote that Crouch, for nearly two years, rented adjoining rooms for herself and her two Maltese dogs at the deluxe Loews Portofino Bay Hotel while she was building the Holy Land Experience theme park in Orlando, Florida. The suit includes allegations that Jan had an affair with a Holy Land Experience employee.

Also in 2012, another of Crouch's granddaughters sued TBN, alleging that she had been molested and raped by a TBN employee at the age of 13. She alleged that Jan Crouch screamed at her and blamed her for the assault. The employee was subsequently fired but was never reported to authorities. Crouch's lawyers said the network was attempting to cover it up to prevent a scandal, but a spokesperson for the network said they acted on what her mother had told them to do. In 2017, a year after Crouch's death, a jury award the granddaughter $2 million in damages for past and future "mental suffering."

Illness and death
Crouch suffered a massive stroke on May 25, 2016, and was hospitalized. She died in Orlando, Florida on May 31, 2016 at age 78.

Awards and honors
 1990: Honorary Doctor of Humane Letters degree from Oral Roberts University
 Golden Angel Award – Excellence in Media
 Two-time Parents Television Council Entertainment Seal of Approval recipient (for TBN and Smile of a Child).

References

External links
 Smile of a Child television network 
 
 Jan Crouch on Find A Grave

1939 births
2016 deaths
American evangelists
Women evangelists
American television evangelists
American television company founders
Burials at Pacific View Memorial Park
Christians from California
Crouch family
Assemblies of God people
People from Columbus, Georgia
People from New Brockton, Alabama
American women company founders
American company founders
Evangel University alumni
Pentecostals from California